Utricularia livida, the leaden bladderwort, is a species of flowering plant in the bladderwort family, native to central and southern  Africa, and Mexico. It was originally described and published by Ernst Heinrich Friedrich Meyer in 1837.

Name
The Latin specific epithet livida means “pale” or “lead-coloured”, referring to the colour of the flowers.

Description
As with other members of its family, the leaf assembly is below ground, where carnivory occurs. Tiny bladders consume micro-organisms which multiply in wet soil. Above ground it consists of kidney-shaped, pale lavender or white flowers on straight slender stems. Flowering occurs mainly during the summer, but may be triggered at any time after a dry period.

Habitat and distribution
Utricularia livida can be found in Angola, the Democratic Republic of the Congo, Ethiopia, Kenya, Lesotho, Madagascar, Malawi, Mozambique, Rwanda, Somalia, South Africa, Sudan, Eswatini, Tanzania, Uganda, Zambia, and Zimbabwe. It also has a widespread native range in Mexico.

Cultivation
Like its relative, U. sandersonii, this plant is valued for  its ornamental flowers and is grown as a houseplant. It does not tolerate freezing,  so in temperate areas it must be cultivated under glass, in pans of damp sand in full sun. It has gained the Royal Horticultural Society’s Award of Garden Merit.

Synonyms 
U. livida covers a large native range and is an extremely variable species, which accounts for the high degree of synonymy.

Calpidisca denticulata (Benj.) Barnhart
Utricularia afromontana R.E.Fr.
U. andicola Benj.
U. denticulata Benj.
U. dregei Kamieński
U. dregei var. stricta Kamieński
U. eburnea R.E.Fr.
U. elevata Kamieński
U. elevata var. macowani Kamieński
U. engleri Kamieński
[U. exilis P.Taylor]
U. gentryi Standl.
U. humbertiana H.Perrier
U. humbertiana var. andringitrensis H.Perrier
U. humilis Phillips
U. ibarensis Baker
[U. kirkii Stapf]
U. livida var. engleri (Kamieński) Stapf
U. livida var. micrantha Kamieński
U. livida var. pauciflora Kamieński
U. lobata Fernald
U. longecalcarata Benj.
U. madagascariensis A.DC.
U. mauroyae H.Perrier
U. odontosperma Stapf
[U. parkeri H.Perrier]
[U. prehensilis var. huillensis Kamieński]
U. sanguinea Oliv.
U. sanguinea var. minor Kamieński
U. sematophora Stapf
U. sinuata Benj.
U. spartea Baker
U. spartea var. marojejensis H.Perrier
U. spartea var. subspicata H.Perrier
U. spartioides Elliot ex H.Perrier
U. sprengelii var. humilis Kamieński
U. transrugosa Stapf
[U. tribracteata Kamieński]

See also 
 List of Utricularia species

References

External links 

Carnivorous plants of Africa
Flora of Angola
Flora of Ethiopia
Flora of Kenya
Flora of Lesotho
Flora of Madagascar
Flora of Malawi
Flora of Mexico
Flora of Mozambique
Flora of Rwanda
Flora of Somalia
Flora of South Africa
Flora of Sudan
Flora of Swaziland
Flora of Tanzania
Flora of the Democratic Republic of the Congo
Flora of Uganda
Flora of Zambia
Flora of Zimbabwe
livida